The following lists events that happened during 2015 in Sierra Leone.

Incumbents
President: Ernest Bai Koroma
Vice President: Samuel Sam-Sumana (until March 17), Victor Bockarie Foh (starting March 17)

Events

February
13 February - Sierra Leone quarantines 700 homes in the Aberdeen district of Freetown following the death of a fisherman.

March 
 14 March - After an armed band removed his personal security guards, the Vice President of Sierra Leone, Samuel Sam-Sumana, goes into hiding after applying for asylum at the United States embassy in Freetown.

Deaths

References

 
Sierra Leone
Sierra Leone
Years of the 21st century in Sierra Leone
2010s in Sierra Leone